Remember When the Music is a posthumously produced album by the American singer-songwriter Harry Chapin, released in 1987. Produced on CD and cassette tape, it contained the same tracks as the album, Sequel, which was the last complete album released during Harry's lifetime, plus two previously unreleased tracks, "Hokey Pokey" and "Oh Man". The order of the first four tracks were changed, fitting in with the new name.

Track listing
"Remember When the Music"
"I Miss America"
"Story of a Life"
"Sequel"
"Up on the Shelf"
"Salt and Pepper"
"God Babe, You've Been Good for Me"
"Northwest 222"
"I Finally Found It Sandy"
"Remember When the Music – Reprise"
"Hokey Pokey"
"Oh Man"

Personnel
Harry Chapin – guitar, vocals, trumpet
Steve Chapin – keyboards
John Wallace – bass
Howie Fields – drums
Doug Walker – electric guitar
Tom Chapin – banjo, guitar
Yvonne Cable – cello
Joe Lala – percussion
Chuck Kirkpatrick – additional background vocals
Howard Albert – synthesizers

References

Harry Chapin albums
1987 albums
Albums published posthumously